Arnautovo is a rural locality (a selo) in Krasnogvardeysky District, Belgorod Oblast, Russia. The population was 526 as of 2010. There are 6 streets.

Geography 
Arnautovo is located 17 km south of Biryuch (the district's administrative centre) by road. Nikitovka is the nearest rural locality.

References 

Rural localities in Krasnogvardeysky District, Belgorod Oblast